Humberto da Silva Fernandes (5 October 1938 – 8 February 2009) was a former Portuguese footballer who played mainly as a centre-back.

Over the course of 12 seasons, Fernandes amassed Primeira Liga totals of 58 games, all at Benfica, winning 11 major titles.

Club career
Born in Penha de França, Lisbon, Fernandes is a youth product of Benfica, serving the club for seventeen seasons. He made his debut on 2 November 1958 in win against Braga. Playing mostly for the reserves, he spent the entirety of his career serving as back-up to Alfredo, Fernando Cruz, Raúl Machado, Jacinto Santos and Germano, appearing only sporadically through the course of 12 years.

In 1970 he left Benfica to sign with Estrela de Portalegre, ending his career at Sport Lisboa e Cartaxo in 1973, at age 36.

Honours
Benfica
Primeira Liga: 1962–63, 1963–64, 1964–65, 1966–67, 1967–68, 1968–69
Taça de Portugal: 1961–62, 1963–64, 1968–69, 1969–70
European Cup: 1961–62
Intercontinental Cup runner-up: 1961, 1962

References

External links

1938 births
2009 deaths
Footballers from Lisbon
Portuguese footballers
Association football defenders
Primeira Liga players
S.L. Benfica footballers